Jakob Fürchtegott Dielmann (9 September 1809, Frankfurt - 30 May 1885, Frankfurt) was a German illustrator, genre and landscape painter. He was also one of the co-founders of the Artists' Colony at Kronberg.

Life 
He was the son of a gardener and began by studying lithography at the J. C. Vogelschen Lithographieanstalt in Frankfurt. In 1835, he later attended the Kunstakademie Düsseldorf on a scholarship and studied with Johann Wilhelm Schirmer. He focused on genre art, but also painted plein air style at the Mittelrhein, the Main and throughout Hesse.

In 1841, Gerhardt von Reutern invited him to visit the Artists' Colony in Willingshausen, where he created scenes of village life. The following year, he opened a studio at the Städelschule and took further lessons with Anton Burger. In the early 1860s, he and Burger moved to Kronberg, where they founded their own artists' colony.

During the last ten years of his life, he suffered from an unspecified infirmity which hindered his ability to paint. Therefore, his oeuvre is not as extensive as it might be otherwise.

Work 
In addition to painting, he often worked as an illustrator, most notably for the four volumes of Robert Reinick's Lieder eines Malers mit Randzeichnungen seiner Freunde: (1838, Vol.1). (1838, vol.2). (1839 and 1846). (1852)
His lithographs include those in: Adelheid von Stolterfoth: Rheinischer Sagenkreis. Ein Cyclus von Romanzen, Balladen und Legenden des Rheins. Jügel, Frankfurt (1835) (nbn-resolving.de) (English: The Rhenish minstrel. A Series of Ballads, traditional and legendary, of the Rhinelands (nbn-resolving.de)

(Digitalizations from the University and State Library Düsseldorf)

References

Further reading 
 Museumsgesellschaft Kronberg im Taunus: Jakob Fürchtegott Dielmann – Gründer der Kronberger Malerkolonie, W. Kramer, Frankfurt (1985)

External links 

 ArtNet: Four pages of paintings by Dielmann
 Kronberger Maler: Brief biography of Dielmann with links to more painting, etc.
 

1809 births
1885 deaths
Landscape painters
Burials at Frankfurt Main Cemetery
19th-century German painters
19th-century German male artists
German male painters